Changchun Confucius Temple is a Confucian temple located in Nanguan District of Changchun, Jilin.

History
Changchun Confucius Temple was originally built in 1872 with the donation of a gentleman named Zhu Chen. In 1894, in the 20th year of Guangxu period of the Qing dynasty (1644–1911), Yang Tonggui, the magistrate of Changchun, built the Wenchang Pavilion.

In 1924, Zhao Pengdi, magistrate of Changchun, raised funds to restore and redecorate the temple.

After establishment of the Communist State, it was used as a primary school's schoolhouse. Part of the temple was demolished. In 1985 it was authorized as municipal level cultural relic preservation organ by the Changchun Municipal Government. And two years later it was classified as a provincial level cultural heritage by the Jilin Provincial Government. The Wenchang Pavilion was reconstruction in 2008.

Architecture
The extant structure is based on the Qing dynasty building principles and retains the traditional architectural style.  Now the existing main buildings include the Zhaobi, Panchi, Panqiao, Bell tower, Drum tower, Hall of Kuixing, Gate of Lingxing, Gate of Dacheng, Hall of Dacheng, Hall of Chongsheng, Wenchang Pavilion, and side halls.

References

External links
 

Buildings and structures in Changchun
Tourist attractions in Changchun
1872 establishments in China
Religious buildings and structures completed in 1872